Jens Andreas Friis (2 May 1821  – 16 February 1896) was a Norwegian philologist, lexicographer and author.  He was a university professor and  a prominent linguist in the  languages spoken by the Sami people. He is widely recognized as the founder of the studies of the Sami languages. Today he is also commonly associated with his novel  Lajla: A New Tale of Finmark, which became the basis for Laila, a 1929 silent film.

Background
Friis was born in Sogndal in Sogn og Fjordane, Norway. He was the son of church vicar Soren Hjelm Friis (1781–1856) and Charlotte Lovise Cammermeyer (1789–1869). He was the brother of priest and politician Nicolai Friis. Friis completed  his final exams from  Møllers Institute  in Christiania in 1840 and earned his cand.theol. in  1844. From 1847 to 1849, he was a research fellow in Sami and Finnish. By the autumn of 1849, he went on a grant to Kajaani, Finland to continue his studies under Lönnrot Elias, the founder of Finnish folklore studies. Friis stayed for a time in Finnmark and in return he assumed teaching ministry for priests.

Career
Friis was appointed reader in Sami languages at the University of Kristiania (now University of Oslo) in 1863. Three years later he was awarded a chair in the Lapp and Kven languages, with a special duty in translation. He published on the Sami language and mythology as well as travel literature about Northern Norway.  Friis established the northern Sami orthography, which although modified through three spelling reforms is in common usage. Until the Konrad Nielsen's dictionary  Lappisk ordbok  was published in three volumes between 1932 and 1938, Friis' Sami dictionary was the most important of its kind. Friis also translated  With Nansen over Greenland in 1888: My journey from Lapland to Greenland by Samuel Balto from the original Sami into the Norwegian language.

Friis' ethnographic maps
Friis published three series of thematic maps covering Norway north of the Ofotfjord. The first edition was published in 1861, and the second in  1888/1890. Each household was coded with a three-way symbol denoting 1) ethnic group 2) household member's fluency in Norwegian, Sami, and Kven, and 3) whether the family lived in a goahti. These maps, in addition to the censuses of 1865, 1875, 1891, and 1900, provide a valuable resource of knowledge of the ethnicity and language in the circumpolar region decades before the enforcement of Norwegian as the single official language in schools.

Selected works
 Lappisk Grammatik, 1856
 Lappiske Sprogprøver. En Samling af Lappiske Eventyr, Ordsprog og Gaader med Ordbog, 1856
 Lappisk Mythologi, Eventyr og Folkesagn, 1871
 En Sommer i Finmarken, Russisk Lapland og Nordkarelen. Skildringer af Land og Folk, 1871
 Hans Majestæt Kong Oscar II's Reise i Nordland og Finmarken Aar 1873, 1874
 Tilfjelds i Ferierne eller Jæger- og Fiskerliv i Høifjeldene, 1876
 . Skildringer, 1881
 Klosteret i Petschenga. Skildringer fra Russisk Lapland, 1884
 Ordbog over det Lappiske Sprog, 1887
 Skildringer fra Finmarken, 1891

References

Other sources
 Lindkjølen, Hans  (1983) J. A. Friis og samene (Hønefoss: Tyri forlag) 
 Hansen, Lars Ivar (1998) Friis' etnografiske kart  i Ottar Tidsskrift fra (Tromsø Museum)

External links
 Friis Ethographical maps of Northern Norway
 
 

1821 births
1896 deaths
Norwegian philologists
Norwegian lexicographers
Sámi languages
Linguists from Norway
Linguists of Kven
Linguists of Finnish
Linguists of Sámi
People from Sogndal
19th-century Norwegian writers
Academic staff of the University of Oslo
19th-century lexicographers